These are the international rankings of Paraguay.

International rankings

References

Paraguay